Chilabothrus monensis, also called the Virgin Islands boa in the Virgin Islands, and possibly sometimes as the Mona Island boa elsewhere, is a species of snake in the family Boidae. It is native to the West Indies.

Distribution and habitat
Chilabothrus monensis is found in the Puerto Rican archipelago, around Mona Island and Cayo Diablo near Puerto Rico, in the U.S. Virgin Islands, and in the British Virgin Islands: Tortola, Great Camanoe, Necker and Virgin Gorda.

Subspecies
Two subspecies are recognized, including the nominate subspecies.

Chilabothrus monensis monensis Zenneck, 1898
Chilabothrus monensis granti Stull, 1933

References

Chilabothrus
Reptiles of Puerto Rico
Reptiles of the United States Virgin Islands
Reptiles described in 1898
Snakes of the Caribbean